Margo Lanagan (born 1960 in Waratah, New South Wales) is an Australian writer of short stories and young adult fiction.

Biography
She grew up in Raymond Terrace and moved to Melbourne circa 1971/1972. After overseas travel, she moved to Sydney in 1982.

Many of her books, including Young Adult (YA) fiction, were only published in Australia, but several have attracted worldwide attention. Her short story collection Black Juice won two World Fantasy Awards and a 2006 Printz Honor Award. It was published in Australia by Allen & Unwin, in the United Kingdom by Gollancz in 2004, and in North America by HarperCollins in 2005. It includes the much-anthologized short story "Singing My Sister Down", which was nominated for both the Hugo and the Nebula Awards for the best short story.

Her short story collection White Time, originally published in Australia by Allen & Unwin in 2000, was published in North America by HarperCollins in August 2006, after the success of Black Juice.  It received recognition as a 2007 Best Book for Young Adults from the American Library Association.

In addition to Black Juice, a 2006 recipient, Tender Morsels also won a Printz Honor Award in 2009.

Tender Morsels was a 2008 Shirley Jackson Award finalist, the novella Sea-Hearts (later expanded into a novel) was a 2009 finalist. Tender Morsels won a World Fantasy Award in 2009 for best novel, and was a Locus Award for Best Young Adult Book nominee. Sea-Hearts won the World Fantasy Award for Best Novella in 2010.

Lanagan is an alumna of the Clarion West Writers Workshop, 1999, and returned as a teacher in 2011 and 2013.

Bibliography

Novels

Teenage romances

As Melanie Carter:
 The Cappuccino Kid (1991). Random House Australia. 

As Belinda Hayes:
 Star of the Show. (1991). Random House Australia. 
 The Girl in the Mirror. (1991). Bantam. 

As Gilly Lockwood:
 Nowhere Girl. (1992). Pan Macmillan. 
 
 

As Mandy McBride:
 
 
 

As Margo Lanagan:

Junior fiction
 
 
 
 Treasure-Hunters of Quentaris: Lothian Books. 2004.
 The Singing Stones: a tale of the shimmaron. ABC Books. 2007.

Young adult fiction
 
 

Fantasy fiction
 Tender Morsels (2008)
 Sea Hearts (Australia)/The Brides of Rollrock Island (UK and US)(2012)

Short story collections
 White Time (2000). (2006). Eos/HarperCollins (US) 0060743948
 Black Juice (2004).  Allen & Unwin (Australia) . HarperCollins (US) 9780060743901 (2005)
 Red Spikes (2006). Allen & Unwin 
 Yellowcake (2011). Allen & Unwin 
 Cracklescape (2012). Twelfth Planet Press

Short fiction
"A Fine Magic" (2006) in Eidolon I (ed. Jeremy G. Byrne, Jonathan Strahan)
"Winkie" (2006) in Red Spikes
"Machine Maid" (2008) in "Extraordinary Engines" (ed. Nick Gevers)
"A Dark Red Love Knot" (2009) in How Beautiful the Ordinary: Twelve Stories of Identity (ed. Michael Chart)
"Ferryman" (2009) in Firebirds Soaring (ed. Sharyn November)
"Mulberry Boys" (2011) in Blood and Other Cravings (ed. Ellen Datlow)
"Blooding the Bride" (May 2012) in Exotic Gothic 4 (ed. Danel Olson)
"The Fifth Star in the Southern Cross" (2013) in After the End: Recent Apocalypses (ed. Paula Guran)
"Mouth to Mouth" (2014) in Novascapes (ed. C.E. Page)

References

External links
 Margo Lanagan and Tender Morsels, interview by Jeff VanderMeer in Clarkesworld Magazine, October 2008

1960 births
Living people
20th-century Australian novelists
20th-century Australian short story writers
21st-century Australian novelists
21st-century Australian short story writers
Australian children's writers
Australian fantasy writers
Australian women novelists
Australian women short story writers
People from Newcastle, New South Wales
Women science fiction and fantasy writers
World Fantasy Award-winning writers
Women horror writers
Weird fiction writers
20th-century Australian women